Dholmara is a small village of Kokrajhar District, Assam, India. The place is well known for golden langur monkeys.

References
 kokrajhar

Villages in Kokrajhar district